The Trip Home is the sixth studio album by American electronic music act The Crystal Method, and is the first solo album by Scott Kirkland.

Track listing

References

The Crystal Method albums
2018 albums